Celestis, Inc. is a company that launches cremated human remains into space, a procedure known as a space burial. It is a subsidiary of the private space company Space Services Inc. The company purchases launches as a secondary payload on various launch vehicles, and launches samples of a person's cremated remains. Launching an individual's entire cremated remains (which weigh between four and eight pounds) would be prohibitively expensive for most people, so Celestis launches small portions of 1-7 grams.

History 
Celestis has flown a number of notable participants over the years. Its first flight – The Founders Flight — carried cremated remains of Star Trek creator Gene Roddenberry and 1960s icon Timothy Leary into Earth orbit. Also on board were remains of physicist and space visionary Gerard K. O'Neill, noted rocket scientist Krafft A. Ehricke, and 20 others. Dr. Eugene Shoemaker — a famous planetary geologist and co-discoverer of Comet Shoemaker-Levy 9 – was launched to the Moon on NASA's Lunar Prospector mission in 1998: Celestis helped friends of Dr. Shoemaker include a sample of his cremated remains on that mission. Mercury 7 astronaut L. Gordon Cooper, Star Trek actor James Doohan ("Mr. Scott"), and a host of others from various walks of life were launched on board The Legacy Flight in 2007. Titanic explorer Ralph White was on board the Discovery and Pioneer flights.

Family members and friends of flight participants usually can attend the launch. Celestis usually arranges for a tour of the launch facility and hosts a non-sectarian memorial service prior to the launch. Celestis also helps people prearrange their own memorial spaceflights for the future.

Flights

Future flights 
In late 2022, as a memorial service for Majel Barrett Roddenberry (Star Treks "Nurse Chapel", the voice of the computer on board the fictional starship Enterprise, and Lwaxana Troi in Star Trek: The Next Generation), her remains will fly with those of her late husband Gene Roddenberry together "on an infinite journey into deep space aboard their Voyager Memorial Spaceflight Service ... will carry their spirits, their memories, and the message of their life’s work into the cosmos." The Enterprise Flight will fly attached to the Centaur V upper stage on the inaugural launch of the Vulcan Centaur rocket.

References

External links 
 

1994 establishments in Texas
Companies based in Houston
Private spaceflight companies
SpaceX commercial payloads
Funeral-related industry